Barbara Howes (May 1, 1914 New York City – February 24, 1996 Bennington, Vermont) was an American poet.

Life
She was adopted and raised in Chestnut Hill, attending Beaver Country Day School. She graduated from Bennington College in 1937.  She edited the literary magazine Chimera from 1943 to 1947 and lived in Greenwich Village. In 1947 she married the poet William Jay Smith and had two sons, David and Gregory. After divorcing in "the mid-1960s", she lived in Pownal, Vermont.

In 1971, she signed a letter protesting proposed cuts to the School of the Arts, Columbia University.

Her work was published in, Atlantic, Chicago Review, New Directions, New Republic, New Yorker, New York Times Book Review, Saturday Review, Southern Review, University of Kansas Review, Virginia Quarterly Review, and Yale Review.

Awards
 Golden Rose Award
 nominated for the 1995 National Book Award for The Collected Poems of Barbara Howes, 1945-1990

Works

Poetry
 
 
 
 
 
 
Moving, Elysian Press (New York, NY), 1983.

Fiction

Editor
 
 
 The Road Commissioner and Other Stories, illustrated by Gregory Smith, Stinehour Press, 1983.

Anthologies
 New Poems by American Poets, Ballantine (New York, NY), 1957
 Modern Verse in English, Macmillan, 1958
 Modern American Poetry, Harcourt (New York, NY), 1962
 Poet's Choice, Dial (New York, NY), 1962
 Modern Poets, McGraw (New York City), 1963
 Of Poetry and Power, Basic Books (New York City), 1964
 The Girl in the Black Raincoat, edited by George Garrett, Duell, Sloane & Pierce, 1966
 The Marvelous Light, edited by Helen Plotz, Crowell (New York, NY), 1970
 Inside Outer Space, edited by Robert Vas Dias, Anchor Books (New York, NY), 1970.

Reviews
Reading the Collected Poems, one sees Howes very clearly as a woman writing in one of the oddest but most important traditions of American poetry. Howes stands with Marianne Moore, Elizabeth Bishop, and ultimately Emily Dickinson in a lineage of women writers passionately committed to the independence and singularity of the poetic imagination. (To this group one might also add Louise Bogan, Julia Randall, May Swenson, and Josephine Miles). They form an eccentric but eminent sorority.

References

External links
 "Barbara Howes", Poetry Foundation
 Barbara Howes Papers. Yale Collection of American Literature, Beinecke Rare Book and Manuscript Library.

1914 births
1996 deaths
Bennington College alumni
American expatriates in Italy
American expatriates in the United Kingdom
Writers from New York City
Writers from Boston
American women poets
20th-century American poets
20th-century American women writers